Ján Šlahor (born 16 May 1977) is a professional Slovak footballer that currently plays for Slovak club SV Ratzersdorf. He is an attacker and he wears number 11.

He represented the Slovakia national football team in the 2000 Summer Olympics in Sydney.

References

External links

Profile 

1977 births
Living people
Slovak footballers
Olympic footballers of Slovakia
Footballers at the 2000 Summer Olympics
ŠK Slovan Bratislava players
1. FC Tatran Prešov players
MŠK Novohrad Lučenec players
FK Inter Bratislava players
FC Senec players
Expatriate footballers in Russia
Expatriate footballers in Austria
Slovak Super Liga players
Association football forwards
FC Mordovia Saransk players